Industrial Heritage Sites of Denmark refer to a list of 25 heritage sites in Denmark that was designated by the Danish Agency for Culture (Kulturarvsstyrelsen, now Kulturstyrelsen) in 2007. The list features Danish industrial buildings representing different eras, industries and geographical regions.

List

See also
 Ole Jørgen Rawert

References

Architecture in Denmark
Industrial buildings in Denmark
Economic history of Denmark
Industrial